George Lee may refer to:

Politicians
 Sir George Lee (English politician) (c. 1700–1758), English politician
 George Leslie Lee (1814–1897), member of the New Zealand Legislative Council
 George Lee, 3rd Earl of Lichfield (1718–1772), British politician and peer
 George Lee, Chinese British, Conservative Parliamentary candidate for Holborn & St Pancras
 George Lee (Australian politician) (1834–1912), New South Wales pastoralist and politician
 George Lee (journalist) (born 1962), Irish economist, journalist and former Fine Gael politician
 George W. Lee (New Jersey politician) (1931–2007), American Democratic Party politician

Sports
 George Lee (basketball) (born 1936), American former basketball player and coach
 George Lee (cricketer, born 1854) (1854–1919), Yorkshire cricketer
 George Lee (cricketer, born 1810) (1810–1894), English cricketer
 George Lee (New Zealand cricketer) (1851-1931), New Zealand cricketer
 George B. Lee (1817–1903), cricketer
 George Lee (footballer) (1919–1991), English footballer
 George Lee (pilot) (born 1946), winner of three World Gliding Championships
 George Lee (athlete) (1886–?), British track and field athlete
 George Lee (American football) (1873–1927), American college football player and medical doctor

Musicians
 George E. Lee (1896–1958), American jazz musician
 George Alexander Lee (1802–1851), English musician

Others
 Sir George Lee, 6th Baronet (1767–1827) of the Lee baronets
 George Lee (actor), British actor, in Spearhead from Space
 George Hay Lee (1808–1873), judge of the Virginia Court of Appeals
 George P. Lee (1943–2010), former Native American General Authority of the Church of Jesus Christ of Latter-day Saints
 George W. Lee (1903–1955), civil rights activist
 George Washington Custis Lee (1832–1913), Confederate Major General in the American Civil War
 George Lee, 2nd Earl of Lichfield (1690–1742)
 George Ludlow Lee Sr. (1901–1966), chairman of the board of Red Devil, Inc.
 George Washington Lee (1894–1976), African-American soldier, author, political leader and corporate executive
 George Augustus Lee (1761–1826), British industrialist
 George Henry Lee, a department store located in Liverpool, England
 George Lee (postmaster), postmaster general of Ceylon

See also
 George Leigh (disambiguation)